Elachista exigua is a moth of the family Elachistidae. It is found in France, Switzerland, Italy and Ukraine.

References

exigua
Moths described in 1978
Moths of Europe